The silver monkey (Cercopithecus doggetti) is a species of Old World monkey found primarily in East Africa. Its range includes Burundi, Tanzania, Rwanda, Uganda, and the Democratic Republic of the Congo. The silver monkey was previously considered a subspecies of the blue monkey (Cercopithecus mitis).

References

Primates of Africa
Guenons
Mammals described in 1907
Mammals of Burundi
Mammals of Tanzania
Mammals of Rwanda
Mammals of Uganda
Mammals of the Democratic Republic of the Congo
Taxobox binomials not recognized by IUCN
Taxa named by R. I. Pocock